The Agreement between Armenia and Azerbaijan respecting the District of Zanghezour was a peace agreement between the short-lived Armenian and Azerbaijani republics signed on 23 November 1919 in Tiflis (present-day Tbilisi) and brokered by Georgia. The peace treaty came as a result of an unsuccessful Azerbaijani military campaign to absorb the Zangezur region controlled by local Armenians, in order to reach and support the Azerbaijanis in control of neighbouring Nakhchivan.

Despite the peace agreement, Azerbaijan in March 1920 again moved its forces westward to attempt to capture Zangezur, however, was stopped due to an Armenian rebellion in Nagorno–Karabakh and the country's sovietisation in April.

Background 

In 1918, after attaining independence from Russia, the newly established Armenian and Azerbaijani republics engaged in a two-year war over their territorial ambitions. The disputed regions were principally Nakhchivan, Zangezur, and Nagorno-Karabakh. Nakhchivan was occupied by the Ottoman army during their invasion of the South Caucasus, however, after their withdrawal, the local Muslim-dominated Republic of Aras was established, lasting until its capitulation to Armenian–British forces in May 1919. After two months of Armenian governance, the region fell again to local control during the summer rebellions against Armenian rule, not being retaken until July of the following year. Following the conclusion of the Turkish–Armenian War, Nakhchivan became a protectorate of Soviet Azerbaijan.

Zangezur was under the control of a local Armenian council in 1918 which successfully resisted Azerbaijani–Ottoman, and later Azerbaijani–British incursions until its incorporation into Armenia in 1919. In 1920, the region was invaded by units of the Red Army who sought to establish a link with the Turkish Nationalists, however, were mostly repelled. In early 1921, shortly after Armenia had been sovietised, an anti-Soviet revolt spread to Zangezur and remained active until July of that year when the rebels fled to neighbouring Iran after receiving assurances that the region "would become a permanent part of Soviet Armenia."

Nagorno-Karabakh similarly to Zangezur was self-governed by its Armenian population since the collapse of Russian authority, however, its key city of Shusha was occupied by Azerbaijani–Ottoman forces in late 1918. After the Ottoman withdrawal from the South Caucasus, the British under the command of General Thomson supplanted their forces in the region and in temporarily assigning Nagorno-Karabakh to Azerbaijan helped subjugate the local Armenian council to assent to Azerbaijani authority pending the result of the Paris Peace Conference. In March 1920, the local Armenians revolted with the support of Armenia, leading to the destruction of the Armenian quarter of Shusha—by April, Armenian forces were in control of the countryside, though were eventually ousted from the region by the Red Army. In 1921, the region was set to become an autonomy within Soviet Azerbaijan.

Situation in Zangezur 

From 1918, Armenian partisan commanders Andranik Ozanian and Garegin Nzhdeh brought about a "re-Armenianization" of Zangezur through the expulsion of tens of thousands of Azerbaijanis, and destruction of tens of villages. These factors coupled with the restrictions imposed by local Armenians on Muslim shepherds taking their flocks into Zangezur served as the casus belli for Azerbaijan's campaign against Zangezur in late 1919.

Following the British withdrawal from the South Caucasus, the Azerbaijani Army and Kurdish militias led by the brother of the Governor-General of Karabakh,  launched a campaign to capture Zangezur on the dawn of 4 November 1919, confident in their success after subjugating the Armenians of Nagorno-Karabakh and the Mughan Soviet Republic. Despite meeting success on all fronts and routing local forces, the Azerbaijanis suffered heavy casualties and retreated on 9 November.

Terms of the agreement 
In Tiflis on 23 November 1919, prime minister Alexander Khatisian of Armenia and prime minister Nasib bey Yusifbeyli of Azerbaijan under combined British and American diplomatic pressure signed a peace treaty under the auspices of foreign minister Evgeni Gegechkori of Georgia and Colonel James Rhea of the United States. UCLA historian Richard G. Hovannisian describes the agreement as "basically a declaration of intent". The terms the two states agreed to were as follow:

 That the government of Armenia and Azerbaijan pledge themselves to stop the present hostilities and not resort to force of arms.
 That the Governments of Armenia and Azerbaijan agree to take effective measures for repairing and re-opening, for peaceful traffic, the roads leading into Zangezur.
 That the Governments of Armenia and Azerbaijan pledge themselves to settle all controversies, including boundaries, by means of peaceful agreements pending the decisions of the conference convened in the following paragraph. In case this is not possible, then to select a neutral party as arbiter, whose decisions, both governments agree to abide by, said neutral party for the present being col. James C. Rhea, U.S. Army.
 That the Governments of Armenia and Azerbaijan pledge themselves to immediately appoint an equal number of delegates to meet in conference in Baku on Wednesday, 26 November, and to sojourn to Tiflis on 4 December, where the meetings of the conference will discuss all questions which are the cause of dispute or friction between the two Governments and will have full authority to settle all such questions by agreement or arbitration.
 That this agreement becomes effective on the date of signing and becomes permanent when ratified by the parliaments of the two governments, and the prime ministers of Armenia and Azerbaijan hereby bind their respective governments to faithfully support and carry out all the details of the above agreement, in evidence of which they place their respective signatures to this agreement, …

Aftermath 
As a result of the agreement, Azerbaijan withdrew its forces from Zangezur, however, alleged that the Armenian army was using artillery to plunder and destroy Muslim villages. On 11–12 March 1920, Azerbaijan dispatched to Zangezur some ninety railway trucks of soldiers from Baku to attempt capture Zangezur again. There was "hard evidence" that Azerbaijan planned to move against Zangezur on 25 March—days before the attack was set to occur, Armenians in Nagorno-Karabakh rebelled against Azerbaijan with the aim of uniting themselves to Armenia, however, the uprising resulted in the destruction of the Armenian quarter of Shusha.

References

Bibliography 

 
 

Treaties concluded in 1919
Treaties of Armenia
Treaties of Azerbaijan
Ceasefires
Armenia–Azerbaijan relations
Armenian–Azerbaijani war (1918–1920)
1919 in Azerbaijan
1919 in Armenia